Deanne Bray (born May 14, 1971) is an American actress. Bray was born deaf and is bilingual in American Sign Language and English. She is best known for her role as Sue Thomas in the show Sue Thomas: F.B.Eye. She is also known for her recurring role as Emma Coolidge on Heroes.

Personal life
Bray was born in Canoga Park, Los Angeles, California and has spent most of her life in southern California. She lived in Seattle for a few years with her mother and attended Washington State School for the Deaf for grade 8 though she was raised mostly by her father in California. Bray's father could do some basic ASL, but her mother chose not to learn any ASL at all. She is married to Troy Kotsur, who is also a deaf actor. Bray is an advocate for improving early childhood education for deaf children and is a spokesperson for Language Equality and Acquisition for Deaf Kids (LEAD-K). On September 8, 2005, she gave birth to daughter Kyra Monique Kotsur.

Bray's parents made certain their daughter was instructed from an early age to speak and write English and learn American Sign Language as well, sending her through a variety of learning programs and centers to strengthen her language skills. A California native, Bray broke into the entertainment industry after she was discovered performing with a deaf dancing group called "Prism West" at a Deaf festival at California State University, Northridge, where she earned a bachelor's degree in Biology. She is pursuing a master's degree in Sign Language Education.

Bray is a co-host with Missy Keast on the DVD Your Pregnancy: What To Expect a comprehensive resource for pregnant deaf and hard of hearing women.

Filmography

Film

Theatre

Television

References

External links

1971 births
Living people
20th-century American actresses
21st-century American actresses
Actresses from Los Angeles
American deaf actresses
American film actresses
American television actresses
California State University, Northridge alumni
People from Canoga Park, Los Angeles